Hyperplatys californica is a species of longhorn beetles of the subfamily Lamiinae. It was described by Casey in 1892.

References

Beetles described in 1892
Acanthocinini